Ion Popescu (born 28 April 1929) is a Romanian former wrestler. He competed at the 1952 Summer Olympics and the 1956 Summer Olympics.

References

External links
 

1929 births
Possibly living people
Romanian male sport wrestlers
Olympic wrestlers of Romania
Wrestlers at the 1952 Summer Olympics
Wrestlers at the 1956 Summer Olympics
People from Galați County